Neāh Conservancy is a conservancy located in the Stikine Region of British Columbia, Canada. The conservancy was established on 31 March 2013 through a cooperative resource management and land use planning agreement between BC Parks and the Kaska Dena First Nations.

Geography
Ne’āh’ Conservancy is located between Cassiar Mountains and the Liard Plains in northern British Columbia. The conservancy borders BC Highway 37 and the much smaller Tā Ch’ilā Provincial Park to the west.

Ecology
The conservancy protects high value habitat for a variety of mammal species such as black bear, boreal woodland caribou, moose, mountain goat, and stone sheep.

References

Conservancies of British Columbia
Provincial parks of British Columbia
2013 establishments in British Columbia
Protected areas established in 2013